CSI: Crime Scene Investigation featured an extensive range of minor characters in addition to its main cast. The American procedural forensics crime drama television series ran on CBS from October 6, 2000, to September 27, 2015. Spanning 15 seasons, it starred William Petersen, Marg Helgenberger, Gary Dourdan, George Eads, Ted Danson, Laurence Fishburne, Elisabeth Shue and Jorja Fox, and was the first in the CSI franchise. The following is a list of minor characters who appeared in the show.

Criminalists 
 Holly Gribbs (Chandra West, season 1); a CSI Level I. Holly was a young, eager CSI with a fear of dead bodies. Holly's mother, Jane, was a lieutenant in traffic who compelled then-crime lab director Jim Brass to get Holly a job. She studied criminal justice and graduated with honors. Holly revealed the fact that being a CSI was her mother's dream, not hers, but was convinced to stay in the role by Catherine Willows. In the pilot episode, when Warrick Brown left her alone at a crime scene to go place a bet, Holly was shot by suspect Jerrod Cooper. Despite efforts to save her, Holly eventually succumbed to her injuries while receiving surgery at a hospital. She was mentioned in Season 1 episodes "Cool Change" and "The Strip Strangler," Season 3 episode "A Little Murder," and the Season 8 episode "For Gedda." Her conversation with Catherine Willows in the pilot episode was also referenced in the Season 12 episode "Willows in the Wind," though she wasn't directly mentioned by name.
 Michael Keppler (Liev Schreiber, season 7); a CSI Level III Assistant Supervisor. Keppler worked with the CSI team of Las Vegas on the graveyard shift, filling in for Gil Grissom, who had gone on sabbatical. He had shot and killed a man accused of raping his lover, Amy, in Philadelphia and had since moved away to Baltimore, then to Las Vegas. Amy's father, Frank, got mixed up in the shooting of a police officer and blackmailed Keppler into letting him go. Keppler subsequently discovered that Frank had raped and killed Amy and framed an innocent man for the crime.  While confronting Frank, Keppler was shot protecting both a prostitute and Catherine Willows. He died in an ambulance minutes later. His death left the CSI team, particularly Catherine who had developed a tighter connection with him recently, devastated.
 Ronnie Lake (Jessica Lucas, season 8); a CSI Level I. Ronnie first appeared during season 8 to be the trainee partner of Sara Sidle when the latter transferred to the swing shift. Lake is very talkative and asks a lot of questions. In the episode "Goodbye and Good Luck", she attempted to get an abused woman into a shelter. When Sara resigned in the same episode, she left a note in Ronnie's locker wishing her good luck. The character has not reappeared since that episode, nor has she been mentioned by any other characters.
 Sean Yeager (Matthew Davis, season 14); a CSI Level III. Sean is a day shift CSI who crosses paths with D.B.'s team on multiple occasions. He is likely partnered with Dawn Banks and develops a friendly rapport with Sidle.
 Dawn Banks (Sherry Stringfield, season 14); a CSI Level III. Dawn is a day shift CSI who goes missing in action. D.B. and his team eventually track her down, saving her life in the process. She is likely partnered with Sean Yeager.

Lab technicians 
 Mandy Webster (Sheeri Rappaport, seasons 1–2; 6–12); a fingerprint technician. Mandy's quick tongue and witty comments often serve as comic relief throughout the series. She made Nick Stokes recite the song "Mandy" for his results in the seventh-season episode "Happenstance". In the seventh-season episode "Lab Rats", Mandy mocked fellow lab tech David Hodges's hush-hush attempt to gather lab techs together to investigate The Miniature Killer with an imitation of Miss Moneypenny from the James Bond films. Hodges gave her the nickname "Miss Mockery". Though she once said a murder involving teenagers may have had something to do with Grand Theft Auto games, she still thinks it is a ton of fun. Mandy's comments about her love life are also regularly featured. She departed the crime lab without explanation in season 12.
 Ronnie Litre (Eric Stonestreet, seasons 1–5); a Q.D. technician. Ronnie is the questioned documents technician from seasons 1-5, who is fascinated by the technology that he uses. In "Revenge Is Best Served Cold" (Season 3, Ep. 1) he was asked to assist Gil Grissom in an experiment to investigate the purpose of a tinted contact lens worn by a female professional poker player. He was asked to identify marked aces in a reversed deck of cards. He asked how many aces there are, either because he did not know how many aces there are in a deck of cards or because he may have suspected that Grissom was trying to trick him.
 Charlotte Meridian (Susan Gibney, seasons 1–2); a fingerprint technician. In the pilot episode, we found out that Charlotte once dated Gil Grissom, but the relationship cooled off when Grissom discovered that Charlotte did not share his passion for Pink Floyd.
 Bobby Dawson (Gerald McCullouch, seasons 1–10); a ballistics expert. Bobby is a firearm and ballistics expert from the second episode ("Cool Change") where he tested the bullets of fallen CSI Holly Gribbs and proved she was shot with her own gun. He was a frequent suspect of murder in David Hodges's board game as seen in the Season 8 episode "You Kill Me". Bobby is a recurring character throughout the series. At the beginning of Season 12, it was revealed that Bobby had been transferred to the dayshift.
 L. Collins (Tom Beyer, season 1); a DNA technician. He mentions that he spent $10,000 on a custom-made coffin.
 Archie Johnson (Archie Kao), seasons 2–12); an A/V technician. Archie is the audio/visual surveillance specialist. In the 7th-season episode "Lab Rats" he assisted Hodges, along with the other lab techs, in trying to figure out who the Miniature Killer was. Archie is a fan of science fiction, and he surfs when he can get away from the lab (season 7, "Lab Rats"). At the beginning of season 8, he had also taken over the role of handwriting analysis. He said it was to expand his horizons and his paycheck. He departed the crime lab without explanation in season 12, although it was heavily implied he was pursuing his dream career as a surfer.
 Judie Tremont (Victoria Prescott, seasons 3–8); a receptionist. She is a secretary of the crime lab in the Season 3 episode "Blood Lust" and onwards. She was used as an experiment in "Blood Lust" to represent a smaller person trying to drag a larger body. Judy is a semi-recurring character in the series.
 Jacqui Franco (Romy Rosemont, seasons 3-5); a fingerprint technician. She is a good friend of Catherine Willows'. She was present for the explosion that injured Greg, although she was unharmed.
 Jessie Menken (Doan Ly, seasons 3; 5-6); a wildlife forensics specialist. She specializes in herpetology, particularly snakes, but is also used in cases involving mammals.
 Leah (Leslie Bega, season 3); a toxicology expert. She previously worked on the day shift but said she prefers nights. She is also a tattoo enthusiast.
 Rich (Paul Francis, season 4); a ballistics expert. Very little is revealed about him, aside from being passionate about guns.
 Mia Dickerson (Aisha Tyler, season 5); a DNA technician. With Greg Sanders's transfer into the field in Season 5, Mia took over the DNA lab. Many lab techs had a crush on her, most notably David Hodges. She had a compulsive personality, once telling Greg that she refused to eat food prepared by others because people talk while they cook and the food ends up being tainted with DNA.
 Neil Jansen (Jason Segel, season 5); a fingerprint technician. A socially awkward technician who appears to have a crush on Sara Sidle. In addition to fingerprints, he is also shown working as a trace tech.

Office of the Chief Medical Examiner 
 Jenna Williams (Judith Scott, season 1); a Medical Examiner. Williams is a Las Vegas medical examiner who assists the Crime Scene Investigators in their work. She presumably works under Al Robbins, though the two never interact. She departed at the time of his arrival.

Consultant specialists 
 Teri Miller (Pamela Gidley, seasons 1–3); a forensic anthropologist. Teri was a forensic anthropologist called in by Gil Grissom's team several times throughout season one to assist with their investigation. She first appeared in the sixth episode, where she reconstructed a woman's face from a skeleton and mold to identify her. The next time she appeared is in the fourteenth episode, "To Halve and to Hold," where she helped Grissom and Catherine Willows piece together a skeleton found in the desert. At the end of the episode, she went out with Grissom on a romantic dinner date. However, Grissom was away at a crime scene, and before he could apologize to Teri, she was gone.  She later appeared in the seventeenth episode, "Face Lift," where she used age progression software to identify a missing girl. During the episode, Grissom asked Teri if they would have dinner again, but she was uninterested.  She appeared again in the penultimate episode of season one, "Evaluation Day," where she identified a headless body as a gorilla, not the human they had first assumed it to be. In season 3, she appeared again in "Snuff" to reconstruct the face of another skeleton, which turned out to be a boy with Down's syndrome. In this episode, Grissom discovered that Teri had since gotten married, ending any hope of a romantic relationship between the two of them.
' Rambar (Tony Amendola, seasons 1, 6); a forensic document examiner. Professor Rambar was the Forensic Document Examiner who analyzed the writing on the bathroom stalls in "I-15 Murders".  He appeared again for two episodes in Season 6: "Secrets and Flies" and "Pirates of the Third Reich".  In the season 8 episode "Go To Hell", Warrick entered the Questioned Documents lab looking for Rambar. He was surprised to find Archie there, who told him that Rambar had been transferred to the FBI lab at Quantico, partly due to poor job performance at the Las Vegas lab.

 Office of the Clark County Sheriff 
 Conrad Ecklie (Marc Vann, seasons 1–2, 5–16); the Clark County Sheriff. He was a former day shift supervisor and was promoted to Assistant Director in season 5. He is known for his strict adherence to regulations and takes on more of the role of a bureaucrat and politician. He also appears to be quite ambitious and career-minded and a vigorous self-promoter; thus, he received praise from senior city and county officials on several occasions. Ecklie and night shift supervisor Gil Grissom have a very rocky relationship throughout the series, with Grissom claiming Ecklie is more concerned with advancement than evidence, and Ecklie maintaining that Grissom shows favoritism toward his subordinates. In season 9, Ecklie was promoted to Undersheriff, following the arrest of former Undersheriff McKeen for the murder of Warrick Brown. In season 13, he accepted a promotion to Sheriff.
 Brian Mobley (Glenn Morshower, seasons 1–2); the Clark County Sheriff. As a sheriff, he was very politically motivated when in office and would prefer that Grissom behaves more like his day-time counterpart, Conrad Ecklie, who knows how to play politics ("Unfriendly Skies"). Portia Richmond ("Table Stakes") helped the Sheriff get elected, and he wanted to close her case quickly, much to Grissom's annoyance.
 Rory Atwater (Xander Berkeley, seasons 4–5); the Clark County Sheriff. Rory was a Sheriff for the LVPD. In "Grissom Versus the Volcano", he was nearly killed in a car bombing while exiting a hotel. The car bomb turned out later to be a completely unrelated event.
 Sherry Liston (Barbara Eve Harris, season 12); the Clark County Sheriff. Sheriff Liston was the Sheriff of Las Vegas County in season 12. She was present at the opening of the Mob Museum, where former mayor Goodman was shot. She was determined to see the crime solved quickly, as an assassination attempt looked bad for the city. She later appeared in "Brain Doe", where she and Catherine discussed the latter's demotion and asked how she was doing. She then told Catherine about a nice job opportunity in Washington, and that she had recommended Willows. She commented that it's hard being a woman in law enforcement and that they needed to look out for one another.  At the end of Season 12, a widespread corruption scandal within the LVPD became apparent, resulting in several deaths, the near-fatal shooting of then-Undersheriff Conrad Ecklie, the tentative resignation of CSI Nick Stokes, and the kidnapping of both D.B. Russell's granddaughter and CSI Julie Finlay. Ashamed by these events, Sheriff Liston resigned off-screen and was succeeded by a fully recovered Conrad Ecklie in season 13.

 Las Vegas Police Department 
 Ray O'Riley (Skip O'Brien, seasons 1–4); an LVPD Detective Sergeant. Sergeant O'Riley was a senior homicide detective and a Sergeant with the LVPD. He regularly accompanied CSIs to crime scenes and assists them with warrants. Ray disappeared without explanation following the show's fourth season, though in season fourteen ("The Fallen"), it is revealed that he was killed in the line of duty in 2003.
 Sam Vega (Geoffrey Rivas, seasons 1–12); an LVPD Detective. Sam was a former member of the LVPD's gang unit. He had a son who owns comic book collectibles. In the Season 12 episode "Crime After Crime", Detective Vega murdered a number of people who escaped justice in cold cases (hired by a dying former detective). He was confronted by Brass and Stokes as he attempted to kill his fourth target but was foiled and instead opted for a suicide by cop.
 Cyrus Lockwood (Jeffrey D. Sams, seasons 2–3); an LVPD Detective. Lockwood was a homicide detective during seasons 2 and 3 before the episode "Inside the Box", where he inadvertently walked in on an armed bank robbery. Lockwood removed his gun so as to save a mother and child, who were also caught up in the robbery, but he was then shot in the back. CSIs later determined he was shot by a sniper from across the street.
 Chris Cavaliere (Jose Zuniga, seasons 4–6, 9–10); an LVPD Detective. A rough detective who once went so far as to scare a child into confession for the murder of his brother. He sometimes takes pictures of bizarrely murdered people for a scrapbook, such as a deceased clown left undressed in a tire ("Getting Off"). In "Say Uncle", Cavaliere was injured after lifting a picture rigged to an explosive device.
 Lou Vartann (Alex Carter, seasons 4–6, 10–13); an LVPD Detective. Detective Vartann is a recurring homicide detective. He has a son and is divorced ("The Panty Sniffer"). He believes Las Vegas has no history because history in Vegas gets imploded ("Bang-Bang"). In Season 10, it was shown that there was something going on between him and Catherine Willows, although neither character said so. They were seen having sex during Season 11 and even considered moving in together. The two separated when Catherine joined the FBI.
 Mitchell (Larry Mitchell, seasons 5–16); an LVPD Officer. Officer Mitchell has appeared in many episodes, occasionally being given lines of dialogue. When the CSI team was investigated regarding allegations of racism following a shoot-out with a Hispanic street gang ("A Bullet Runs Through It, Part 1"), Mitchell arrived at the scene of the shootout in progress and said sardonically to an injured gang member who was begging for help, "I don't speak Spanish." He was one of the police officers shot at by Mark Powell in "The Fallen", but he recovered from his injuries.
 Carlos Moreno (Enrique Murciano, seasons 10, 12–13); an LVPD Detective. Moreno is former detective Sam Vega's stepson. He has a good working relationship with the CSIs, especially Stokes. His street smarts and local knowledge often come in handy during investigations. He developed a romantic interest in Finlay, though the two never consummate their relationship. He departed the series without an explanation.
 Frankie Reed (Katee Sackhoff, season 11); an LVPD Detective. Detective Reed worked closely with Nick Stokes and was not very sensitive, which she was working on.

Murderers
 Paul Millander (Matt O'Toole); a serial killer who posed as a judge and serves as Gil Grissom's nemesis. Millander is one of only ten murderers to be featured in multiple episodes; the other nine being Tammy Felton, "The Blue Paint Killer", "The Miniature Killer", "The West Siblings", "Dr. Jekyll", "The Dick and Jane Killer", Jared Briscoe, and Paul Winthrop. In the pilot episode, Millander's fingerprints turned up on the tape-recorder used for the suicide note of Royce Harmon, the first victim. Gil Grissom met and questioned him and learned that Millander had a company that makes Halloween costumes called Halloweird. He made a mold of his own hand for a particular costume that comes with a bloody arm, and Grissom concluded that may have been how Millander's prints got into the crime scene. Someone may have bought the hand and used it as a red herring. In the episode "Anonymous", another suicide was staged and again Millander's prints showed up. Grissom still thinks that it was a red herring, but toward the end of the episode, a homeless man who was used by the killer to deliver a cryptic message to the CSI team described Millander as the man who approached him. Grissom then realized that he had been tricked and that it was Millander all along. Grissom traveled to Millander's workplace and found it empty apart from a stool and an envelope addressed to Grissom. There was nothing written inside the envelope, telling Grissom that he has nothing. The episode ended with Paul Millander going into the CSI headquarters and asking for Grissom. Millander was told that Grissom is not there, and as he turned to leave, he looked at the surveillance camera and waved. Millander was not seen again until season two, where yet another suicide was staged in exactly the same way as the previous two. The team realized that Millander targets middle-aged father figures who share a birthday with the anniversary of his father's death. His father was murdered in a staged suicide when he was a child, but the authorities ruled it as a suicide because he was unable to give evidence effectively in court, despite the fact he had witnessed the murder. Moreover, the CSI team found out that Millander was assigned female at birth—named Pauline Millander—which added to his ineffectiveness as a witness of his father's murder. He underwent sexual reassignment in his youth and as a result, his relationship with his mother was a complicated one. The CSI team also found out that he was leading a double life, one as Paul Millander and the other as the Honorable Judge Douglas Mason. As Douglas Mason, he had a respectable job, a wife, and an adopted son. When Grissom went to visit him, he claimed to not know any Paul Millander and suggests the doppelgänger theory as an explanation as to why they look exactly the same. Grissom takes a sample of Mason's fingerprints after he touched the bars in the prison but later discovered that they were the fingerprints on file for Judge Douglas Mason. It is later discovered that the fingerprints belonged to Paul's father. By the end of "Identity Crisis", Grissom finally had enough evidence to arrest Judge Mason/Paul Millander, but Millander escaped custody yet again and returned to his home where his mother lives. He then proceed to kill her and end his own life in the same way he staged the other suicides and his father's murder/suicide, leaving behind a tape with a message on it. Grissom found him dead in his bathtub during the very last scene of this episode. It was then found that Millander and Grissom shared the same birthday. In the tenth season, his adopted son, Craig Mason, was suspected of being a killer but was ultimately cleared.
 Tammy Felton (played by Brigid Brannagh) was originally named Melissa Marlowe, but was abducted by her babysitter, Mara Felton, and raised by her and her husband Joe. Tammy first appears in the season one episode "Face Lift," where her father, Joe, is found murdered in a shop. Grissom discovers a fingerprint and matches it to a child that had been kidnapped years before, Melissa Marlowe. Catherine continues to investigate the murder, and Tammy becomes the prime suspect, after age enhanced photos of Melissa Marlowe reveal that she is in fact Tammy Felton. Tammy is arrested for the murder of Joe Felton, but her biological parents, the Marlowes, make bail and Tammy goes on the lam. Tammy returns in season two episode "And Then There Were None," wherein she and several others rob a casino. In the same episode, she is murdered by her accomplice, ending her life on the lam.
 Ex-Undersheriff Jeffrey McKeen (Conor O'Farrell, seasons 5–9, 12–13) was a politically motivated bureaucrat. McKeen approved an elaborate "reverse forensics" deception in "Redrum" where the CSI would stage a crime scene to draw out a suspect from hiding, although he neglected to consult the district attorney beforehand and almost ruined the case. He held Greg Sanders responsible for the death of Demetrius James, a suspect Greg hit with his car during an attack, despite the fact that Greg was ruled "excusable". Later, McKeen turns out to have links to organized crime. When a corrupt police officer, Daniel Prichard, frames Warrick Brown for the murder of mob boss Lou Gedda, McKeen attempts to have Warrick put away but Warrick is found innocent. Shortly after, McKeen stops Warrick in his car, where Warrick tells him he won't give up until the mole is caught. McKeen shoots Warrick twice in the neck to prevent himself from being tied to the crimes, then calls for assistance, framing Daniel Prichard. Grissom is first on the scene and Warrick dies in Grissom's arms. In the season nine premiere "For Warrick," McKeen is eventually found out but plans to flee to Mexico with Prichard. Prichard attempts to steal McKeen's weapon and in the altercation, their car crashes off a cliff, killing Prichard. McKeen manages to crawl away where he is hunted down by Nick Stokes. McKeen taunts Nick to kill him, but instead, Nick fires "a miss". McKeen is eventually arrested by Jim Brass and is presumably jailed. In the aftermath of his arrest, Conrad Ecklie, the former day shift supervisor, becomes the new Undersheriff. He later resurfaces in the final episode of season 12, "Homecoming", where he attempts to get his revenge, orchestrating the kidnapping of DB Russell's granddaughter and the shooting of Conrad Ecklie from his prison cell. In the opening episode of season 13, "Karma to Burn", the CSI manages to find Russell's granddaughter and tie the crimes back to McKeen, whilst Ecklie also survived. He is last seen at the end of this episode, where Russell promises to transfer him to a higher security prison, ending his reign of terror.
 Dr. Jekyll (Matt Ross) is the name given to a murderer who appears throughout the tenth season. As of the 17th episode of season ten, he is presumed to have murdered three times, as well as to have caused three further deaths through neurosurgery which caused a victim to have uncontrollable rage. His first crime was an operation on a corpse in the episode "Family Affair". He is revealed to be Charlie DiMasa, the son of a restaurant owner. His dreams of becoming a doctor were thwarted by his father (whom he also attempts to kill). His victims were close customers or associates of his father (Charlie called them his "heroes"). In the season ten finale, Dr. Jekyll is discovered to have planted a valve in the artery of his father. While investigating with Dr. Langston and an LVPD officer, Dr. Jekyll shoots and kills the officer while wounding Nick Stokes in the shoulder. After Langston distracts Dr. Jekyll, Nick shoots and kills him while playing dead, though his left arm is injured in the process.
 Sqweegel (Daniel Browning Smith) is the name given to an elusive serial killer under the alias "Ian Moone" (I am no one), who wears a skin-tight latex suit. He is a skilled contortionist and acrobat, which allows him to fit through the tightest spaces and stay out of sight. His modus operandi is to sneak into his victim's house and sleep under their bed, live in their attic, and read their mail. After a few weeks of this, he will come out of hiding and attack his victim with a straight razor, asking them to admit their dark secrets. He will then disappear for a few weeks and return to murder his victims if they have not confessed to their crimes. He kills two of his victims, Ryan Fink and Carrie Jones, and attacks a third, Margot Wilder. He escapes into the night before the CSIs can apprehend him. It was rumored he would return later in season eleven, and Anthony Zuiker posted on his Twitter page that it was possible, but by the time season eleven ended, Sqweegel had not yet made any other appearances on the show. Carrie Jones's daughter gave Sqweegel his name, as she traumatically associated him with the sound of the scrubbers in the car wash ("squeegel squeegel") where her mother was killed.
 Nathan "Nate" Haskell (born Warner Thorpe), a.k.a. "The Dick and Jane Killer" (sometimes acronymed "DJK"), is a serial killer who appeared in season nine, ten, and eleven. He is portrayed by Bill Irwin. During Langston's lecture in "19 Down", Haskell claims to have been physically abused by his alcoholic father, Arvin Thorpe, every day when he was a child. He only has vague memories of his mother, who was killed by Arvin when Nate was eight years old. It was revealed in Targets of Obsession that Nate carries the MAO-A gene, a gene which, according to some studies, causes a predisposition towards violence. Exactly how long he has known about it is currently unknown to everyone except himself. His first animal kill was a cat, which he killed when he was nine years old. His first human kill was a traveling salesman named Douglas Nathan Haskell, whose identity he partially adopted as his own. He killed him the same way he later tortured his female victims in his room. In the mid-1990s, he became a serial killer. He became known as "The Dick & Jane Killer" when he started targeting couples. None of the female victims were ever found and Haskell later refused to discuss them. He killed a total of at least 14 people in Nevada, Arizona and California (the first couple, the Steiners, were never found). Even though he never held down a single job or filed a tax return during this time (likely because he was living under an assumed name), he could still afford the occasional restaurant visit, earning money by donating blood and semen or taking part in psychological studies. During a restaurant visit, he had a chance encounter with future serial killer Charlie DiMasa. In Reno, he stopped at a sobriety checkpoint. That stroke of luck allowed the authorities to charge him; inside the car, they found blood belonging to a victim, under his fingernails they found DNA from another, a potential murder weapon was found, and a witness was able to place him with another one of the victims. When the case went to trial, Haskell initially denied any guilt but later changed his mind and confessed. He was sentenced to life in prison without the possibility of parole and incarcerated in Ely, Nevada. While there, he appears to have gained a kind of cult following (he claims to have "students" everywhere) and was even proposed to several times. In "Meat Jekyll", Haskell is brought to the Las Vegas crime lab after claiming to know Dr. Jekyll's identity. After the case is concluded, he stabs Ray in the back with a shiv made out of his broken glasses. When guards hear it, Haskell is shocked by his electric restraints and beaten. After a brief stay in the hospital, he is taken back to Ely. He reappears in "Targets of Obsession" when he is taken to court to be charged with attempting to kill Ray. Several of his female "fans" are present. After being convicted, he switches his inmate badge for that of a minimum security inmate and gets into a transport van in his place. On the road, it is sabotaged by two of his female fans, who kill the guards. After one of the women kills the other, she drives away with Haskell. He reappeared in "Father of the Bride" when he kept sending messages to the father of one of his female fans, threatening to kill her. In "Cello and Goodbye", Haskell went to Los Angeles and abducted Gloria Parkes, Ray Langston's ex-wife, and took her to his childhood home, where he raped and tortured her. When Ray tracked him down to the Thorpe house, where Haskell had tortured and killed his father, he had a confrontation with Haskell that resulted in the latter's death. The season ends in a cliffhanger when Ray is asked by IA whether his killing Haskell was an act of self-defense or murder.
 The Miniature Killer (real name Natalie Davis), a.k.a. "The Miniature Serial Killer", is a serial killer. She is portrayed by Jessie Collins. The Miniature Killer was introduced in the seventh-season premiere and, after being the main subject for the whole season, was identified in the finale. The key signature of the Miniature Killer’s crimes were meticulous scale models built to reflect each crime scene. The models were either left at the murder site or delivered to someone involved in solving the case. Every detail was accurate and even used the victim's real blood instead of paint. Every model also contained a hidden picture of a bloodied doll and an item somehow related to bleach. Her victims were killed in widely different manners, including bludgeoning, poisoning, and electrocution. Many of her victims had employed her services as a cleaning lady (paying under the table), and several also had connections to her foster father. Natalie appeared in a season 9 episode when Grissom attended her hearing, where it was decided that she was to be transferred to another jail and would no longer be receiving therapy, as it was decided that therapeutic treatment had been successful. She expressed to Grissom the belief that she had changed and that she felt remorse for her actions. After she is taken out, Grissom inspects a loose floor tile in her cell, lifting it up to find a miniature of Natalie hanging from the bottom by its neck, thus suggesting she still plans to hang herself, as per her original plan.
 The Blue Paint Killer (real name Kevin Greer) was a student-turned-professor at Western Las Vegas University. He is portrayed by Taylor Nichols. He would paint a railing on a walking path blue, but the paint was mixed with motor oil to keep it tacky. He'd then wait behind a bush next to a water fountain for his victims until a specific person would wash their hands. In the season three episode "The Execution of Catherine Willows", Greer's accomplice, John Mathers, has been caught and found guilty of the various murders that Greer himself had committed. Mather's execution is interrupted by a last-minute postponement of the judgment. When Mathers was accused, there was no DNA testing, but with the new technology of DNA testing, John Mathers' hair matched with evidence on one of the victims. But the case still wasn't concrete as there was little evidence to link Mathers to all the murders; this is because he was just an accomplice. The case fell to Catherine who, after examining the case, concluded that Mathers was guilty of the murders and was executed. When the execution had been completed, they found a new victim indicating that Mathers wasn't the serial killer. Greer knows of the execution and feels remorse, causing him to lay low for a while before he starts killing again. In the season five episode "What's Eating Gilbert Grissom?", it has been two years since the execution of John Mathers, and Gil Grissom is called in to investigate a homicide. The corpse at the university had been shredded in a wood-chipper. Upon examining the remains Grissom finds something familiar, traces of blue paint and motor oil, but unlike the other victims, this one was a man. Greer mistook him for one of his victims as the man had long blonde hair and it was a dark night. They found a bad blow-up doll in the garbage containing a chunk of hair from a previous victim. In the mouth of the doll, there was an artist’s sketch. In the picture, a frightened woman was begging for her life in the back of what appeared to be a van and through the van's windows, they could see the logo of an erotic store. They saw a van outside the shop, which resembled the one in the sketch. When they opened it, they found the body of Debbie Reston. In the shop, they found a comic book filled with stories and images of women being dominated and tortured, the artist’s style matched the sketch of the drawing in the doll, the style of Greer. They discover the paper was printed from the university where Greer worked. When they go to his house to arrest him, they discover he is already at the police station waiting to speak to Grissom. In interrogation, he reveals that there is another victim that they need to save, but this is just a ruse. When they go to leave, Greer asks to go to the toilet. When he goes into the cubicle, he suffocates himself with a plastic bag that he had hidden on him. While being questioned in the interrogation room, he made one of his usual drawings as an apparent suicide note, with the slight difference being that when it was folded a certain way, the drawing of a bound girl turned into the face of Grissom, the mouth of which said "Goodbye".
 Hannah and Marlon West (a.k.a. "The West Siblings") were a brother and sister duo that were also serial killers. They were portrayed by Juliette Goglia and Douglas Smith, respectively. Their parents were killed in a car accident about a year prior to "Goodbye and Good Luck". The season six episode "The Unusual Suspect" introduced Marlon while on trial for the murder of one of his female classmates, Stacey. His sister, Hannah, a child prodigy, takes the stand and confesses that she herself murdered Stacey, not Marlon. The judge grants the prosecution 72 hours to re-examine the evidence before the jury delivers its verdict. In the end, Marlon is found not guilty by the jury. Hannah asked Sara to speak to her alone and admits that she did not kill Stacy, and was, in fact, covering for Marlon. In the season eight episode "Goodbye and Good Luck", it's shown that Hannah had graduated from Harvard, and was now teaching at the college Marlon attended. A broken tooth from the crime scene ties Marlon to the death of Kira Dillinger since it appears that Kira punched him and embedded a tooth in her hand. Kira had slept with another man that night, and both were high on GHB. It turns out that their sexual lubricant was spiked, and Marlon's fingerprints were on the tube. All the evidence points to Marlon being the murderer, but Sara is convinced that Hannah is the guilty one. She believes Hannah wants to get rid of Kira to have her brother all to herself. Marlon confesses to Sara that he had Hannah help him spike the lubricant, but he wouldn't have physically harmed Kira. Sara believes him and they try to get Hannah to confess to Marlon privately, but she notices immediately that he's wearing a wire, and avoids answering Marlon's questions directly. When asked why she killed Kira, her response was "Because I love you". Marlon hangs himself in his jail cell not long after Hannah visits him. When Sara arrives at the college campus to bring Hannah the news, Hannah doesn't believe her and says that Sara is lying and trying to manipulate Hannah into a confession. When Sara shows Hannah a picture of her deceased brother, Hannah is devastated and breaks down. It is not known whether Hannah was ever charged with Kira's murder.

Others
 Lady Heather (Melinda Clarke); a dominatrix and later a sex therapist. She appears in several episodes, crossing paths with four of the five major CSI protagonists: Gil Grissom (William Petersen), Catherine Willows (Marg Helgenberger), D.B. Russell (Ted Danson), and Raymond Langston (Laurence Fishburne), though she never appeared alongside Julie Finlay (Elisabeth Shue).
 Kristine Marie Hopkins  (Krista Allen); a prostitute who first appears in the pilot, where she is suspected of drugging a man and stealing his possessions. Nick Stokes investigates the case but makes a deal with Kristy that if she tells him what she used and gives the man his possessions back, she can go without a charge. During his short conversation with Kristy, he strikes up an instant rapport with her. The next time Kristy shows up is in the episode "I-15 Murders", where she is in trouble with a security officer at a shop. She specifically asks for Nick to help her out, claiming the security guard spat on her. Again, the chemistry between Nick and Kristy is present, and Nick decides to help her out. He takes Kristy's clothing and gets Greg Sanders to run a test on it for a certain enzyme to be found in spit. Greg finds that there is a concentration of amylase on her top which proves the security officer spat on her. Kristy re-appears in the episode "Boom" (first season) when Nick sees her on the side of a road having an argument with a man Nick assumes to be a client. He tells the man to back off and drops Kristy off at her home, but Kristy invites him in, and they eventually have sex. Kristy also tells him that she plans to come off the game and go back to college. The next morning, Nick leaves, but since it is his day off, he goes back to Kristy's house to spend some time with her. When he arrives, he finds emergency services and one of the CSIs from the day shift at her house, as Kristy has been murdered. Conrad Ecklie takes the case; since Nick's fingerprints and DNA are at the crime scene, he considers Nick a suspect. This seriously endangers Nick's career: if he is arrested, he is automatically not allowed to be a criminalist anymore, even if he is cleared of all charges later. Catherine Willows takes over the case for twelve hours; with the help of Greg Sanders, she finds evidence that proves Nick was not the murderer. Instead, the man Nick saw with Kristy earlier was the killer who tried to frame Nick. It is revealed that the man is actually Kristy's pimp; according to him, she was going back to college to recruit more girls, not to gain an education. It is left unsure if this is the truth, but Nick nevertheless pays for a proper burial for Kristy out of respect for her.
 Tony Thorpe' (a.k.a. The Parking Garage Rapist) (Aldis Hodge). In 2000, a woman named Pamela Adler was raped as she was leaving her office late at night. Thorpe had been lying in wait and ambushed Adler, beating her until she fell into a coma. Sara Sidle was the primary investigator and found evidence to tie Thorpe to the rape, but Adler's coma made a positive identification impossible, and Thorpe was released on a technicality. Sidle promised Thorpe she would finally see him arrested. Adler's husband Tom was now left with the responsibility of caring for his ailing wife. After nearly a decade, Adler killed his wife by cutting off her life support. Adler claimed he did so out of desperation, claiming Thorpe raped Pamela again and even threatened murder. However, years earlier Thorpe had been involved in a gang-related shooting that left him paralyzed, making the second rape impossible. Thorpe had therefore an alibi; at the conclusion, Adler was arrested for murder while Thorpe remained a free man.

See also
 List of CSI: Crime Scene Investigation characters

References

 
Lists of CSI (franchise) characters